Fork Creek is a  long 4th order tributary to the Deep River in Randolph County, North Carolina.

Variant names
According to the Geographic Names Information System, it has also been known historically as: 
Crooked Creek
Pork Creek

Course
Fork Creek rises about 1 mile northeast of Michfield, North Carolina in Randolph County and then flows southeasterly to join the Deep River about 3 miles east-northeast of Jugtown.

Watershed
Fork Creek drains  of area, receives about 47.3 in/year of precipitation, and has a wetness index of 393.07 and is about 54% forested.

See also
List of rivers of North Carolina

References

Rivers of North Carolina
Rivers of Randolph County, North Carolina